The Moore House is a historic house on Washington County Road 13 northwest of Canehill, Arkansas.  It is a two-story wood-frame house, three bays wide, with a side gable roof, clapboard siding, and a shed-roof porch extending across the front.  The first floor of the house was built in 1856, with the second following in 1896; a kitchen ell was added to the rear in 1893.  The property also includes the remains of an early log structure, probably a granary.

The house was listed on the National Register of Historic Places in 1982.

See also
National Register of Historic Places listings in Washington County, Arkansas

References

Houses on the National Register of Historic Places in Arkansas
Houses completed in 1856
Houses in Washington County, Arkansas
National Register of Historic Places in Washington County, Arkansas
1856 establishments in Arkansas